Jan van Troyen (1610 – 1670) was a Flemish engraver and etcher.  He is mainly known for the work he did for David Teniers the Younger on the illustrations for the Theatrum Pictorium, an publication which gave an overview of the paintings in the collection of the Archduke Leopold Wilhelm.

He accompanied Teniers to Vienna after the Archduke Leopold Wilhelm returned there in 1658. He was there presumably to make engravings after paintings in the Archduke's cabinet that were to be published in the 1673 version. He is last recorded in Brussels in 1670 and 1671.

Most of his works are engravings of Italian paintings in the Archduke's cabinet. He was possibly related to the painter of Italianate landscapes Rombout van Troyen.

References

1610 births
1670 deaths
Flemish engravers